The Remington Honor Medal, named for eminent community pharmacist, manufacturer, and educator Joseph P. Remington (1847-1918), was established in 1918 to recognize distinguished service on behalf of American pharmacy during the preceding year, culminating in the past year, or during a long period of outstanding activity or fruitful achievement.

Awarded annually by the American Pharmacists Association, the Remington Medal is the highest recognition given in the profession of pharmacy in the US.

Past recipients 
Source: American Pharmacists Association - Past Recipients

See also

 List of chemistry awards
 List of medicine awards

References

External links
 http://www.aphanet.org/
 http://www.pharmacist.com/AM/Template.cfm?Section=News_Releases2&template=/CM/ContentDisplay.cfm&ContentID=25003

Medicine awards
Chemistry awards
Awards established in 1918
Pharmacy in the United States
American awards